Glory Days (also titled Demontown) is an American mystery drama television series which was broadcast on The WB Television Network from January 16 to March 25, 2002. The series was created by Kevin Williamson, and starred Eddie Cahill, Poppy Montgomery, and Jay R. Ferguson.

Synopsis
The series involves novelist Mike Dolan (Cahill) returning to his hometown, where various odd and unpleasant occurrences are happening.

Cast
 Eddie Cahill as Mike Dolan
 Poppy Montgomery as Ellie Sparks
 Jay R. Ferguson as Sheriff Rudy Dunlop
 Emily VanCamp as Sam Dolan
 Ben Crowley as Zane Walker
 Amy Stewart as Sara Dolan
 Theresa Russell as Hazel Walker
 Frances Fisher as Mitzi Dolan

Episodes

Production
Kevin Williamson originally conceived Glory Days as a drama in the same vein as his first series, Dawson's Creek, and a pilot was produced using this format. After picking up the series, The WB asked Williamson to retool the show and turn it into a mystery series instead. The characters and relationships remained the same but a whodunit spin was added.

The series was produced by Dimension Television and Outerbanks Entertainment, and filmed at The Bridge Studios in Vancouver, B.C., Canada.

Home media
The series was released on Region 2/PAL DVDs in Europe.

In most European countries (including the United Kingdom and Ireland) it is released under the DVD title Demontown with seven episodes edited into three feature-length parts: Demontown (episodes 1, 2 & 3), Demontown II (episodes 4 & 5), and Demontown III (episodes 6 & 7). Each part is available as three separate straight-to-DVD ‘movies’.

In the Netherlands, the series is available as a 2-disc DVD set with all three parts included (Demontown and Demontown II on disc one, and Demontown III on disc two).

References

External links 
 
 

2002 American television series debuts
2002 American television series endings
2000s American crime drama television series
2000s American horror television series
English-language television shows
Television series by Disney–ABC Domestic Television
Television series by Miramax Television
Television series created by Kevin Williamson
Television shows filmed in Vancouver
Television shows set in Washington (state)
The WB original programming